Friðrik Þór Friðriksson (born 6 October 1964) is an Icelandic former international football goalkeeper.

He played club football for Fram Reykjavik, Breiðablik, Fram again, B1909 (Denmark), Þór Akureyri and ÍBV.

Friðrik won 26 caps for the senior Iceland team, the first in a 4–0 friendly win in the Faroe Islands on 2 August 1982.

Former Olympic alpine skier Nanna Leifsdóttir is Friðrik's wife. Their daughter is Iceland women's national football team player Fanndís Friðriksdóttir.

References

External links

1964 births
Living people
Icelandic footballers
Expatriate men's footballers in Denmark
Iceland international footballers
Iceland under-21 international footballers
Association football goalkeepers